Peter James Armitage  (23 October 1939 – 30 November 2018) was an English television and stage actor best known for his role as Bill Webster on long-running soap opera Coronation Street. He was a regular on British screens from the 1970s onwards.

Early life
Armitage was born out of wedlock in Skipton, West Riding of Yorkshire, where he was brought up primarily by his aunt until the age of 10, when his mother married. He did not meet his father, who was German, until he was 28, and the two did not form a long-term relationship. Armitage attended Glusburn secondary modern school, then was apprenticed to a firm building diesel engines for five years. He subsequently spent a further four years in the Merchant Navy before settling in London, where he worked as a banksman on the construction of the Victoria line. He then trained as an actor at the East 15 Acting School in Loughton, Essex.

Career
Armitage had three spells as the character Bill Webster on Coronation Street, appearing in the role in 1984–1985 (for six months), then from 1995 to 1997 and again from 2006 to 2011. He had previously appeared as a different character playing a painter and decorator in two episodes in 1977. In 2014 Armitage stated in an interview that he hoped to return to the series after successfully battling bowel cancer.

In the hard-hitting British police drama The Sweeney, Armitage appeared as Herbert "Jacko" Jackson in the episode Big Spender. His character was that of a crooked ticket attendant of a car park company who becomes involved with an organized crime family in and attempt to defraud his employers.
  
His other TV credits include Lovejoy, The Befrienders, Couples, Jack the Ripper and Hearts and Minds. He also appeared in Lucky Feller, a short-lived sitcom starring David Jason. In 1998, played Danny Ormondroyd in a stage adaptation of the film Brassed Off at the Sheffield Crucible and London’s Olivier Theatre.

Personal life
Armitage married actress Annabel Scase in 1970; the couple had two children, Daniel and Sally, and later divorced.

Armitage lived in Cross Hills, North Yorkshire and subsequently in Cononley near Skipton. He was appointed a Member of the Order of the British Empire (MBE) in the 2011 Birthday Honours for services to amateur theatre in Yorkshire.

Armitage died of a heart attack on 30 November 2018, aged 79. He was survived by his children.

References

External links
 
 

1939 births
2018 deaths
Alumni of East 15 Acting School
English male soap opera actors
English male stage actors
English people of German descent
20th-century English male actors
21st-century English male actors
People from Skipton
Male actors from Yorkshire
Members of the Order of the British Empire